Lewis Stone "Bob" Sorley III (born August 3, 1934) is an American intelligence analyst and military historian. His books about the U.S. war in Vietnam, in which he served as an officer, have been highly influential in government circles.

Biography
Lewis Sorley was born in 1934, in West Point, New York, the son and grandson of officers in the United States Army who were both also West Point graduates. Sorley became an Eagle Scout in San Antonio, Texas, in 1950 and was presented the Distinguished Eagle Scout Award in 2009. He received his high school education at Texas Military Institute, where he is listed as a distinguished graduate, and was admitted to the United States Military Academy, from which he graduated with a Bachelor of Science degree in military engineering in 1956.

From August to December, 1956, he attended Armor Officer Basic Course, Fort Knox, Kentucky. In January 1957, he attended Parachute and Jumpmaster Courses, Fort Benning, Georgia. From February through October he was assigned to Company H, 2nd Armored Cavalry Regiment, Fort Meade, Maryland as a reconnaissance platoon leader. Then he was promoted to company commander. In October, he went with an advance party (Operation Gyroscope, in which the entire regiment went to Germany, taking the place of another regiment there that came back to Fort Meade) as executive officer (XO) of Company H, a part of the 3rd Squadron, 2nd Armored Cavalry Regiment in Amberg, West Germany. From October 1957 to June 1960 he served with 3rd Squadron, 2nd Armored Cavalry Regiment, in Amberg as XO of Company H, a tank platoon leader in Tank Company and Squadron S-4 (Supply Officer). From June 1960 to June 1961 he commanded A Company, 6th Armored Cavalry Regiment, at Fort Knox, Kentucky. From June 1961 until May 1962, he attended the Armor Officer Advance Course at The Armor School, Fort Knox, Kentucky.

In 1963, he received a Master of Arts degree in English literature from the University of Pennsylvania. From 1963 to 1966 he served at the United States Military Academy as an instructor and assistant professor in the Department of English. From 1966 to 1967 he served as executive officer, 1st Tank Battalion, 69th Armor, U.S. Army in the Republic of Vietnam. From 1968 to 1970 he served as assistant secretary of the General Staff, Office of the Chief of Staff, U.S. Army. In 1971 and 1972 he was commander, 2nd Battalion, 37th Armor, U.S. Army, Erlangen, West Germany. In 1973 he joined the faculty of the U.S. Army War College as the program director in the Department of Military Planning and Strategy. While there, he completed a Master of Public Administration at Pennsylvania State University. He also attended Harvard University and the U.S. Naval War College. In 1975 he became the senior military assistant to the director of net assessment, Office of the Secretary of Defense, where he served for two years.

In 1976, he retired from the Army as a lieutenant colonel and joined the Central Intelligence Agency (CIA), where he became the chief of the Policy and Plans Division, Intelligence Community Staff. In 1978 he became a senior inspector in the Office of Inspector General. In 1979 he was appointed chief of audit support and was awarded a Doctor of Philosophy in national security policy from Johns Hopkins University. In 1982 he was appointed office director and program manager, National Intelligence Emergency Support Office, where he served until 1983.

He was associated with the Center for Strategic and International Studies from 1984 to 1985 and is a member of the advisory council of National Defense Intelligence College as well as the International Institute for Strategic Studies.

Sorley's 2004 book Vietnam Chronicles: the Abrams Tapes won the Army Historical Foundation's Trefry Award for providing "a unique perspective on the art of command". His 2008 book Honor Bright: History and Origins of the West Point Honor Code and System points out the similarities between the West Point motto of "Duty, Honor, Country" and the Boy Scouts of America's Scout Oath, stating that each may have influenced the other, pointing out that last part of the Scout Oath was once part of the Cadet Prayer: "...physically strong, mentally awake, and morally straight."

Awards and accomplishments 
 Who's Who in America 2001–present
 Distinguished Graduate, United States Military Academy
 Outstanding Alumnus, Army War College
 Distinguished Eagle Scout
 Distinguished Writing Award, Army Historical Foundation
 Goodpaster Prize, American Veterans Center
 Trefry Prize, Army Historical Foundation
 Gold Medallion, Order of St. George, United States Armor Association
 Distinguished Book Award, Army Historical Foundation
 Peterson Prize, Best Scholarly Article on American Military History
 Distinguished Graduate, Texas Military Institute
 Distinguished Graduate, School of Naval Command & Staff
 Pi Alpha Alpha, National Honorary Society for Public Administration
 Freedoms Foundation, George Washington Honor Medal
 Distinguished Member of the Regiment, 37th Armor
 Emeritus Director of the Army Historical Foundation
 Executive Director Emeritus of the Association of Military Colleges and Schools of the United States
 Interviewed for Ken Burns's series The Vietnam War

Faculty appointments 
 Gottwald Visiting Professor of Leadership and Ethics, Virginia Military Institute (Spring 2009)
 Adjunct Professor, Defense Intelligence College (1988) and Virginia Tech (1980)
 Program Director, Department of Military Planng and Strategy, US Army War College (1973–1975)
 Visiting Lecturer, University of Virginia (1970), The George Washington University (1969), and the University of Rhode Island (1967–1968)
 Instructor and assistant professor, United States Military Academy (1963–1966)

Selected works
Westmoreland: The General Who Lost Vietnam. Boston: Houghton Mifflin Harcourt, 2011.  
 Sorley, Lewis, editor. The Vietnam War: An Assessment by South Vietnam's Generals. Lubbock, Tex: Texas Tech University Press, 2010.  
Honor Bright: History and Origins of the West Point Honor Code and System. Columbus: McGraw Hill, 2008.  
Vietnam Chronicles: the Abrams Tapes, 1968–1972. Lubbock: Texas Tech University Press, 2004.  
A Better War: The Unexamined Victories and Final Tragedy of America's Last Years in Vietnam. Orlando: Houghton Mifflin, 1999.  
Honorable Warrior: General Harold K. Johnson and the Ethics of Command. Lawrence: University Press of Kansas, 1999.  
Thunderbolt: General Creighton Abrams and the Army of His Times. New York: Simon & Schuster, 1992.  
Arms Transfers Under Nixon: A Policy Analysis. Lexington: The University Press of Kentucky, 1981

References

External links
Participation in panel discussion, Writing on War in the 21st Century at the Pritzker Military Museum & Library
Moderated panel discussion, Dwight David "Ike" Eisenhower at the Pritzker Military Museum & Library
Discusses his Vietnam Chronicles at the Pritzker Military Museum & Library
Discusses his Honor Bright: History & Origins of the West Point Honor Code at the Pritzker Military Museum & Library

The William E. Colby Military Writers' Symposium at Norwich University
A Discussion on the Landmark Documentary “The Vietnam War” by Ken Burns and Lynn Novick
The Real Afghan Lessons From Vietnam
LEWIS S. SORLEY PAPERS, 1925-1960,Herbert Hoover Presidential Library

American military historians
American male non-fiction writers
Historians of the Vietnam War
United States Military Academy alumni
Living people
1934 births
TMI Episcopal alumni
United States Army officers